Line 3 of the Changsha Metro is a rapid transit line in Changsha. The first phase opened on 28 June 2020 with 25 stations.

A southern extension called Xihuan line (West Ring line) from Shantang to Xiangtan North railway station is expected to open in 2023.

Opening timeline

Stations

Future development
A southern extension called Xihuan line (West Ring line) to Xiangtan North railway station in neighbouring Yuhu District of Xiangtan City started construction in 2019 with a planned opening in 2023. The extension is 17.29 km long with 8 stations. In the long-term planning, this extension will be extended northward to Changsha West Railway Station and separated from Line 3 to be operated as its own independent line.

References

Changsha Metro lines
2020 establishments in China
Railway lines opened in 2020